Stamford High School is a public high school located in Stamford, Texas and classified as a 2A school by the University Interscholastic League (UIL). It is part of the Stamford Independent School District located in north central Jones County.  In 2013, the school was rated "Met Standard" by the Texas Education Agency.

Athletics
The Stamford Bulldogs compete in these sports:

Baseball
Basketball
Cross country
Football
Golf
Powerlifting
Softball
Tennis
Track and field

State titles
Football - 
1955(2A), 1956(2A), 1958(2A), 2012(1A/D1), 2013(1A/D1)
Boys' Golf - 
1954(1A)
Boys' Track - 
1957(1A), 1997(2A), 2009(1A)
Girls' Softball
2021(2A)

^Stamford was stripped of the 1959 Class AA state football championship by the UIL resulting in Brady winning by forfeit 2-0.  (the actual score was 19-14 Stamford).  This was the first and (as of 2008) one of only two instances where a Texas state football championship was awarded via forfeit.

State finalists
Football 
1959(1A/D1) **2011(1A/D1)
Girls Basketball 
2022(2A)

References

External links
Stamford ISD

Public high schools in Texas
Schools in Jones County, Texas